Alioto is a surname. Notable people with the surname include:

Angela Alioto, American politician
Dario Alioto, American poker player
Joseph Alioto, American politician
Kathleen Sullivan Alioto, American editor and politician
Massimo Alioto, American engineer
Michela Alioto-Pier, American politician
Tim Alioto, American soccer player
Tom Alioto, American soccer player

See also
Alioto's